The 2032 Summer Olympics, officially known as the Games of the XXXV Olympiad and also known as Brisbane 2032, is an upcoming international multi-sport event scheduled to take place from 23 July to 8 August 2032, in Brisbane, Queensland, Australia.

It will be the third Summer Games to be held in Australia after the 1956 Summer Olympics in Melbourne, Victoria and the 2000 Summer Olympics in Sydney, New South Wales. It will also be the fourth Summer Games to be held in the Southern Hemisphere, after the aforementioned games in Australia and the 2016 Summer Olympics in Rio de Janeiro, Brazil. This will also be the second Summer Games to be held entirely in a host country's meteorological winter, after Rio de Janeiro.

Following changes in the bidding rules, the International Olympic Committee selected and announced Brisbane as the winning bid on 21 July 2021, two days before the start of the 2020 Summer Olympics. Brisbane was first announced as the preferred bid on 24 February 2021, gaining the formal approval of the IOC Executive Board on 10 June 2021. Brisbane became the first host city to be selected to host the Olympics through the new bid process. This will be the second consecutive Summer Games to be held in an English-speaking country; the 2028 Summer Olympics are scheduled for Los Angeles, California, in the United States.

Bidding process

The new IOC bidding process was approved at the 134th IOC Session on 24 June 2019 in Lausanne, Switzerland. The key proposals, driven by the relevant recommendations from Olympic Agenda 2020, are:
Establish a permanent, ongoing dialogue to explore and create interest among cities/regions/countries and National Olympic Committees for any Olympic event
Create two Future Host Commissions (Summer and Winter Games) to oversee interest in future Olympic events and report to the IOC executive board
Give the IOC Session more influence by having non-executive board members form part of the Future Host Commissions.

The IOC also modified the Olympic Charter to increase its flexibility by removing the date of election from 7 years before the games and changing the host from a single city/region/country to multiple cities, regions, or countries.

The change in the bidding process was criticised by members of the German bid as "incomprehensible" and hard to surpass "in terms of non-transparency".

Future Host Summer Commissions
The full composition of the Summer Commissions, oversee interested hosts, or with potential hosts where the IOC may want to create interest, is as follows:

Dialogue stages
According to Future Host Commission terms of reference with rules of conduct, the new IOC bidding system is divided into two dialogue stages:
 Continuous Dialogue: Non-committal discussions between the IOC and Interested Parties (City/Region/Country/NOC interested in hosting) concerning hosting future Olympic events.
 Targeted Dialogue: Targeted discussions with one or more Interested Parties (called Preferred Host(s)), as instructed by the IOC Executive Board. This follows a recommendation by the Future Host Commission as a result of Continuous Dialogue.

Host selection
Without any rival bid, Brisbane was confirmed as host of the 2032 Summer Olympics at the 138th IOC Session on 21 July 2021 in Tokyo, Japan. As per the new format of choosing future Olympic Games host cities from the IOC's Agenda 2020, the vote was in a form of a referendum to the 80 IOC delegates. According to the Australian Broadcasting Corporation, 72 of the delegates voted Yes, 5 voted No and 3 other voters abstained.

Organisation
Brisbane Organising Committee for the 2032 Olympic and Paralympic Games was established by the Queensland Government in 2021 to plan, organise and deliver the Olympic and Paralympic Games in accordance with the host contract.

Development and preparations
From the 2021 selection of the city as the host for the 2032 Summer Olympics, Brisbane has 11 years to prepare for the games. The Brisbane bid relied on the premise that over 80 percent of the venues needed to host the games were already existing infrastructure. A 2019 feasibility study suggested that over A$900 million would be needed from both state and federal funding to host the games. The bid received federal government support in 2019.

Venue construction and renovations
The majority of venues for the Games are existing or undergoing renovations and upgrades. Most of the new venues would be situated in the Brisbane Zone, such as the planned Brisbane Live precinct located at Roma Street. The Brisbane Live precinct will house a 17–18,000 person arena as its centrepiece and will be used for events such as aquatics. The precinct will also include a new railway station under Roma Street. The precinct construction cost is around A$2 billion, with an estimated completion date of 2024.

In April 2021, Premier of Queensland Annastacia Palaszczuk stated that the Brisbane Cricket Ground would undergo an approximately A$1 billion redevelopment to serve as main stadium if Brisbane were awarded the Games, under which the stadium will be "entirely demolished" and expanded to a capacity of 50,000. A new pedestrian plaza would also be constructed, which has been proposed as a site for public festivities during the Games.

Infrastructure

As of 2021, Brisbane has many infrastructure projects under construction or planning on top of the games. The Cross River Rail, scheduled to be completed in 2024, is an underground railway project through central Brisbane, which is under construction. The Cross River Rail will see the development of a new rail line underneath Brisbane River, and the redevelopment of several stations in the Brisbane central business district with a cost of over A$5 billion. Other transport infrastructure projects include the Brisbane Metro bus rapid transit project that will see the construction of two routes with a headway of up to three minutes during peak times. The project is scheduled to be completed by 2023.

Brisbane Lord Mayor Adrian Schrinner proposed that a  glass factory at 137 Montague Rd, South Brisbane, be redeveloped into a  International Broadcasting Centre along the banks of the Brisbane River.

The main Athletes' Village will be constructed at Hamilton.

Venues

Venues will be located in three zones in South East Queensland: Brisbane as main host city, and neighbouring areas Gold Coast and Sunshine Coast. Another five cities will host football preliminaries: Cairns, Toowoomba and Townsville in the state of Queensland. Melbourne and Sydney—Australia's two previous host cities in 1956 and 2000, respectively—will also host football preliminaries.

The Games
Under current IOC policies, the program of the Summer Olympics consists of "28 core" sports that persist between Games, with other slots able to be filled with backing of the IOC and organising committee (within a maximum number of athletes) in order to improve local interest and eventual chances of medals.

Various sanctioning bodies have announced plans to pursue bids for sports to be added to the 2032 Summer Olympics:
 In February 2021, Softball Australia, Baseball Australia and the World Baseball Softball Confederation backed both baseball and softball to be part of the 2028 and 2032 programs. CEO of Baseball Australia Glenn Williams noted record broadcasting audiences for baseball and softball at the 2020 Summer Olympics, with Softball Australia chair Richard Lindell also supporting the sports re-inclusion as a permanent fixture in the Summer Olympics. Both disciplines have medaled for Australia at the Olympics and a baseball specific site at the proposed Breakfast Creek Sports Precinct in Albion would bolster their bid.
 In July 2021, International Rugby League (IRL) chair Troy Grant stated that pursuing rugby league for Queensland 2032 was a "priority" for the organisation, with a particular focus on rugby league nines for the Olympics and wheelchair rugby league for the Paralympics. Queensland has a popular rugby league fanbase.
 In August 2021, the International Cricket Council (ICC) announced the establishment of a working group to pursue cricket for the Los Angeles 2028 and/or Brisbane 2032 Summer Olympics, including representatives from USA Cricket, the Asian Cricket Council, England and Wales Cricket Board (ECB), and Zimbabwe Cricket. The bid has also received backing from the Board of Control for Cricket in India (BCCI). Cricket is one of the most popular sports in Australia, and Cricket Australia is one of the 12 full members of the ICC.
 In August 2021, World Netball announced that it would pursue the inclusion of netball, with backing from Netball Australia. The country has won the Netball World Cup eleven times since its inception. The bid faces a potential obstacle from the IOC's current policy of gender balancing, as the game is primarily played as a women's sport at its highest levels (although men's netball has seen growth).

Broadcasting
Domestically, the Games will be televised by the Nine Network, which acquired the rights to the Olympics from 2024 through 2032 in a deal announced 8 February 2023. These Games mark the final year of nearly all of the IOC's current long-term broadcasting contracts.
Albania – RTSH
Australia – Nine Network
Austria – ORF
Belgium – RTBF, VRT
Brazil – Grupo Globo
Bulgaria – BNT
Canada – CBC/Radio-Canada
China – CMG
Croatia – HRT
Czech Republic – ČT
Denmark – DR, TV 2
Europe – EBU, Warner Bros. Discovery
Estonia – ERR
Finland – Yle
France – France Télévisions
Germany – ARD, ZDF
Greece – ERT
Hungary – MTVA
Iceland – RÚV
Ireland – RTÉ
Israel – Sports Channel
Italy – RAI
Japan – Japan Consortium
Latvia – LTV
Lithuania – LRT
Montenegro – RTCG
Netherlands – NOS
North Korea – JTBC
Norway – NRK
Poland – TVP
Slovakia – RTVS
Slovenia – RTV
South Korea – JTBC
Spain – RTVE
Sweden – SVT
Switzerland – SRG SSR
Ukraine – Suspilne
United Kingdom – BBC
United States – NBCUniversal

See also

 Major sport events in Brisbane and surrounding areas

References

External links
 

 
 

Summer Olympics 2032
Sports competitions in Brisbane
Summer Olympics by year
Olympics
Olympics
 
Olympics
Olympics